In the 2002 Lao League, MCTPC FC (Ministry of Communication, Transportation, Post and Construction) won the championship, with Vientiane Municipality runners up.

References

Lao Premier League seasons
1
Laos
Laos